Buttrey is a surname. Notable people with the surname include:

Edward Buttrey (born 1965), American politician
Gordon Buttrey (1926–2012), Canadian ice hockey player
Kenny Buttrey (1945–2004), American drummer and music arranger
Theodore V. Buttrey Jr. (1929–2018), American numismatist
Ty Buttrey (born 1993), American baseball player

See also
Buttrey Food & Drug, defunct grocery store chain in Montana, United States